Contracted from the term micro reciprocal degree, the mired is a unit of measurement used to express color temperature. Values in mireds are calculated by the formula:

 

where T  is the colour temperature in units of kelvins and M denotes the resulting mired dimensionless number. The constant  is one million kelvins.

For convenience, decamireds are sometimes used, with each decamired equaling ten mireds. The SI term for this unit is the reciprocal megakelvin (MK−1), shortened to mirek, but this term has not gained traction.

The use of the term mired dates back to Irwin G. Priest's observation in 1932 that the just noticeable difference between two illuminants is based on the difference of the reciprocals of their temperatures, rather than the difference in the temperatures themselves.

Examples

In photography, mireds are used to indicate the color temperature shift provided by a filter or gel for a given film and light source. For instance, to use daylight film (5700 K) to take a photograph under a tungsten light source (3200 K) without introducing a color cast, one would need a corrective filter or gel providing a mired shift

 

This corresponds to a color temperature blue (CTB) filter.

Color gels with negative mired values appear green or blue, while those with positive values appear amber or red.

References

Units of measurement
Non-SI metric units
Color